Richard Ramsbottom (1749–1813) was a British Tory politician, MP for New Windsor from 1806 until 1810, when he was succeeded by his nephew, John Ramsbottom.

He lived at Clewer Cottage, near Windsor, Berkshire.

References

Members of the Parliament of the United Kingdom for constituencies in Berkshire
People from Windsor, Berkshire
1749 births
1813 deaths
UK MPs 1806–1807
UK MPs 1807–1812